The Shore Inn is a public house in Portsoy, Aberdeenshire, Scotland. Dating to the mid-18th century, it is now a Category C listed building. It is two storeys with an attic.

Given its historical status, planning permission to replace the building's first-floor windows with uPVC ones in 2020 was denied.

The inn featured in the sixth series of the BBC television series Peaky Blinders, for which it was renamed the Hotel Lalanne."Peaky Blinders filming locations: where is it set as Cillian Murphy and cast seen in Portsoy shooting season 6" – The Scotsman, 9 February 2021

Gallery

See also
List of listed buildings in Portsoy, Aberdeenshire

References

Pubs in Scotland
18th-century establishments in Scotland
Listed buildings in Portsoy